A microbial cyst is a resting or dormant stage of a microorganism, usually a bacterium or a protist or rarely an invertebrate animal, that helps the organism to survive in unfavorable environmental conditions. It can be thought of as a state of suspended animation in which the metabolic processes of the cell are slowed and the cell ceases all activities like feeding and locomotion. Encystment, the formation of the cyst, also helps the microbe to disperse easily, from one host to another or to a more favorable environment. When the encysted microbe reaches an environment favorable to its growth and survival, the cyst wall breaks down by a process known as excystation. In excystment, the exact stimulus is unknown for most protists.

Unfavorable environmental conditions such as lack of nutrients or oxygen, extreme temperatures, lack of moisture and presence of toxic chemicals, which are not conducive for the growth of the microbe trigger the formation of a cyst.

The main functions of cysts are to protect against adverse changes in the environment such as nutrient deficiency, desiccation, adverse pH, and low levels of O2, they are sites for nuclear reorganization and cell division, and in parasitic species they are the infectious stage between hosts.

Cyst formation across species

In bacteria
In bacteria (for instance, Azotobacter sp.), encystment occurs by changes in the cell wall; the  cytoplasm contracts and the cell wall thickens. Bacterial cysts differ from endospores in the way they are formed and also the degree of resistance to unfavorable conditions. Endospores are much more resistant than cysts.

Bacteria do not always form a single cyst. Varieties of cysts formation events are known. As an example Rhodospirillium centenum can change the number of cell per cyst usually ranging from 4 to 10 cells per cyst depending on environment.

In protists

Protists, especially protozoan parasites, are often exposed to very harsh conditions at various stages in their life cycle. For example, Entamoeba histolytica, a common intestinal parasite that causes dysentery, has to endure the highly acidic environment of the stomach before it reaches the intestine and various unpredictable conditions like desiccation and lack of nutrients while it is outside the host. An encysted form is well suited to survive such extreme conditions, although protozoan cysts are less resistant to adverse conditions compared to bacterial cysts. In addition to survival, the chemical composition of certain protozoan cyst walls may play a role in their dispersal. The sialyl groups present in the cyst wall of Entamoeba histolytica confer a net negative charge to the cyst which prevents its attachment to the intestinal wall thus causing its elimination in the feces. Other protozoan intestinal parasites like Giardia lamblia and Cryptosporidium also produce cysts as part of their life cycle (see oocyst). Due to the hard outer shell of the cyst, Cryptosporidium and Giardia are resistant to common disinfectants used by water treatment facilities such as chlorine. In some protozoans, the unicellular organism multiplies during or after encystment and releases multiple trophozoites upon excystation.

In nematodes
Some soil-dwelling plant parasitic nematodes, such as the soybean cyst nematode, or the potato cyst nematode form cysts as a normal part of their lifecycle.

In Heterodera rostochiensis ( Golden Nematode), the survival of cysts was evaluated in a study conducted by the Department of Plant Pathology at New York State College of Agriculture. This study showed that the viability of encysted larvae declined rapidly at relative humidities of 88% and under 2%. Free larvae did not survive prolonged exposure to relative humidities of over 80 °F, 20% and 3% at either 75 °F of 40 °F. Survival of encysted larvae in dry, moist and flooded soils showed rapid regression with increase in soil moisture. Although some cysts were viable after flooding for period of eight months, the number of survivals was greatest in air-dry soil.

In crustaceans

Various types of branchiopods can produce diapause cysts.  This is an adaptation to living in ephemeral pools in fresh or saltwater habitats.  It also aids in dispersal via the wind or in the digestive tracts of birds.  Cysts from Daphnia have even been revived after having been buried for 600 years.  Examples among the branchiopods include: Artemia and Streptocephalus in Anostraca; Triops in Notostraca; Cyzicus in Diplostraca; and Alona, Latonopsis, Macrothrix, Moina, and Sida in Cladocera.

Among other crustaceans, some ostracods—such as Cypridopsis, Cyprinotus, Physocypria, and Potamocypris—develop diapause cysts.  Among copepods, Cyclops does as well.

Other animals

Rotifers also produce diapause cysts.

Composition of the cyst wall
The composition of the cyst wall is variable in different organisms. The cyst walls of bacteria are formed by the thickening of the normal cell wall with added peptidoglycan layers whereas the walls of protozoan cysts are made of chitin, a type of glycopolymer. Nematode cyst walls are composed of chitin reinforced by collagen. The cyst wall is composed of four layers, ectocyst, mesocyst, endocyst, and the granular layer. The ectocyst a thin dense layer. The mesocyst is the thickest layer and composed of a compact material. The endocyst is a thin layer, just not as dense as the ectocyst. The granular layer varies in thickness and is composed of granular material. The sugars in the cyst wall are N-acetylglucosamine (90%) and glucose (10%).

Pathology 
While the cyst component itself is not pathogenic, the formation of a cyst is what gives Giardia its primary tool of survival and its ability to spread from host to host. Ingestion of contaminated water, foods, or fecal matter gives rise to the most commonly diagnosed intestinal disease, Giardiasis.

Whereas it was previously believed that encystment only served a purpose for the organism itself, it has been found that protozoan cysts have a harboring effect. Common pathogenic bacteria can also be found taking refuge in the cyst of free-living protozoa. Survival times for bacteria in these cysts range from a few days to a few months in harsh environments. Not all bacteria are guaranteed to survive in the cyst formation of a protozoan; many species of bacteria are digested by the protozoan as it undergoes cystic growth.

See also 
Spore (in bacteria, fungi and algae)
Endospore (in firmicute bacteria)
Resting spore (in fungi)
Trophozoite
Cryptobiosis

References

Microbiology
Pathology